Theodore Michael Leonard (born September 22, 1971) is an American vocalist and guitarist, best known as the lead singer for the progressive rock band Enchant. He has also provided lead vocals for Thought Chamber, Spock's Beard, and Pattern-Seeking Animals.

Leonard's influences include Paul Rodgers, Doug Pinnick/King's X, Jellyfish, Steve Walsh/Kansas, Yes, Rush, Tears for Fears, Neal Morse, Steve Perry, and Queensrÿche.

Discography

Solo albums
 Way Home (2007)

Enchant
 A Blueprint of the World (1993)
 Wounded (1996)
 Time Lost (1997)
 Break (1998)
 Juggling 9 Or Dropping 10 (2000)
 Blink of an Eye (2002)
 Tug of War (2003)
 Live at Last (2004)
 The Great Divide (2014)

Spock's Beard
 Live at High Voltage Festival (2011)
 Brief Nocturnes and Dreamless Sleep (2013)
 The Oblivion Particle (2015)
 Noise Floor (2018)

Thought Chamber
 Angular Perceptions (2007)
 Psykerion (2013)

Xen
 84.000 Dharma Doors (1999)

Affector
 Harmagedon (2012)

Andrew Gorczyca
 Reflections - An Act of Glass (2009)

Transatlantic
 KaLIVEoscope (2014)

Neal Morse
 Jesus Christ - The Exorcist (2019)

Pattern-Seeking Animals
 Pattern-Seeking Animals (2019)
 Prehensile Tales (2020)
 Only Passing Through (2022)

References

External links
 Enchant official website
 Spock's Beard official website
 Pattern-Seeking Animals official website

American rock singers
American rock guitarists
American male guitarists
Progressive rock guitarists
Performers of Christian rock music
American performers of Christian music
Living people
1971 births
People from Arcadia, California
Singers from California
Guitarists from California
Spock's Beard members
Transatlantic (band) members
21st-century American singers
21st-century American guitarists
21st-century American male singers